Sylvia Jeffreys (born 23 April 1986) is an Australian journalist and news presenter.

Biography

Jeffreys is currently co-host of Today Extra with David Campbell. She has previously been a news presenter on the Nine Network's Today, reporter and presenter on Nine News and reporter on A Current Affair.

Career
Jeffreys went to Brisbane State High School before beginning her media career in August 2005 at the Nine Network in Brisbane, working as a script assistant in the newsroom. She completed a Bachelor of Journalism/Bachelor of Arts at the University of Queensland whilst honing her skills in the production office.

In 2008, she began filing lifestyle stories on Queensland's Extra program, before returning to the newsroom in 2009.

In 2011, Jeffreys was appointed weekend weather presenter on Nine News Queensland. Sylvia reported on many news events as a reporter and weather presenter for Nine News Queensland including the floods in Central Queensland, Brisbane, Ipswich and Grantham. She also travelled to Tully to report on the damage carved by Cyclone Yasi.

In January 2012, Sylvia moved to Sydney to join Today as a New South Wales reporter. She remained a reporter on the show until June 2013 and was replaced by Natalia Cooper. She then joined Nine News as a reporter and a fill in presenter on Nine Morning News, Nine Afternoon News, Weekend Today and Today.

In June 2014, Jeffreys rejoined Today as news presenter replacing Georgie Gardner.

In 2016, Jeffreys began hosting Nine's netball coverage, starting with the Fast5 Netball World Series in Melbourne. She also hosts Nine's coverage of the new Suncorp Super Netball competition, which started in 2017. She no longer presents the network's netball coverage.

In December 2018, it was announced that Jeffreys would not return to Today in 2019 and move onto other projects.

In February 2019, the Nine Network announced Jeffreys would be spread across “a few departments” including A Current Affair.

In August 2019, Jeffreys was appointed host of 9NewsWatch, a bulletin broadcast at 8pm on weeknights on Facebook.

In December 2019, it was announced that Jeffreys would co-host Today Extra replacing Sonia Kruger.

Personal life 
In December 2013, Sylvia said that she was dating fellow Nine News reporter Peter Stefanovic, the younger brother of Today host Karl Stefanovic. Jeffreys and Stefanovic were fill-in co-hosts of Weekend Today while Cameron Williams and Leila McKinnon were on leave.

In July 2016, Jeffreys announced that she was engaged to Stefanovic; the couple married on 1 April 2017. The couple reside in the exclusive Sydney suburb of Double Bay.

In August 2019, Jeffreys and Stefanovic announced that they are expecting their first child. On 31 January 2020, Jeffreys and Stefanovic welcomed a boy named Oscar.

In October 2020, Jeffreys and Stefanovic announced that they are expecting their second child, a boy. On 3 April 2021, Jeffreys and Stefanovic welcomed a boy named Henry.

References

External links
Nine News

Nine News presenters
Australian reporters and correspondents
Living people
1985 births
People educated at Brisbane State High School